Jean Klein (born 21 December 1942) is a Luxembourgian footballer. He played in 16 matches for the Luxembourg national football team from 1963 to 1969.

References

1942 births
Living people
Luxembourgian footballers
Luxembourg international footballers
Place of birth missing (living people)
Association footballers not categorized by position